An Affair to Forget may refer to:

 "An Affair to Forget" (Frasier), an episode of the US sitcom Frasier
 "An Affair to Forget" (Will & Grace), an episode of the US sitcom Will & Grace
 "An Affair to Forget", an episode of the US sitcom The Mary Tyler Moore Show
 "An Affair to Forget", an episode of the Canadian television serial comedy Butch Patterson: Private Dick
 "An Affair to Forget", an episode of the British medical drama Holby City
 "An Affair to Forget", an episode of the US sitcom The Parent 'Hood
 "An Affair to Forget", an episode of the Australian television drama McLeod's Daughters
 "An Affair to Forget", an episode of the US sitcom Three's Company
 "An Affair to Forget", an episode of the US sitcom Who's the Boss?
 "An Affair to Forget", an episode of the US sitcom Laverne & Shirley
 "An Affair to Forget", an episode of the US sitcom Boy Meets World
 "An Affair to Forget", an episode of the US sitcom Mama's Family